Cliff Stewart Bentz (born January 12, 1952) is an American lawyer, rancher, and politician serving as the U.S. representative for Oregon's 2nd congressional district. A member of the Republican Party, he is the ranking member on the House Natural Resources Committee Subcommittee on Water, Oceans and Wildlife and sits on the House Judiciary Committee. He previously served in the Oregon Senate, representing the 30th district in Eastern Oregon. He also served in the Oregon House of Representatives, representing the 60th district, which encompasses Malheur, Baker, Harney, and Grant counties, and part of Lake County, and includes the cities of Baker City, Burns, and Ontario. 

In May 2020, Bentz won the Republican primary for Oregon's 2nd congressional district and faced Democrat Alex Spenser and Independent Patrick Archer in November. He was elected to the U.S. House of Representatives on November 3, 2020.

In February 2021 he was made ranking member of the Subcommittee on Water, Oceans and Wildlife.

Early life and education
Bentz was born in Salem, Oregon, and raised on ranches in the eastern Oregon communities of Fields and Drewsey. He graduated from Regis High School in the Willamette Valley city of Stayton in 1970. He received a bachelor's degree from Eastern Oregon State College (now Eastern Oregon University) in 1974 and a J.D. from Lewis & Clark Law School in 1977.

Career 
From 1977 to 1980, Bentz was a law associate with the Ontario, Oregon, law firm Yturri Rose, and was made a partner in the firm in 1980, a position he still holds. He specializes in agricultural, water, and real property law. He also owns a 100-acre alfalfa farm.

Early political career
Bentz began his career as a member of the Oregon Water Resources Commission from 1988 to 1996. He served as chair of the commission from 1994 to 1996.

Oregon legislature
In 2008, Bentz was appointed by county commissioners in House District 60 to replace Tom Butler in the Oregon House of Representatives after Butler resigned to pursue a church mission. He defeated Tim K. Smith in the Republican primary in May 2008, and was unopposed in the general election. In 2010, Bentz won another term unopposed in both the primary and the general election.

On January 8, 2018, Bentz was sworn in as state senator to replace Ted Ferrioli, who resigned to take a political appointment. Bentz resigned his seat in the Oregon House and was appointed to the senate seat by the county commissioners in the senate district.

Since 2018, Bentz's largest campaign contributors have been Ironside Associates, a London-based security firm; his brother James Bentz; and his farm, Actin Ranch.

Beginning June 20, 2019, all 11 Republican state senators for Oregon, including Bentz, refused to show up for work at the Oregon State Capitol, instead going into hiding, some even fleeing the state. Their aim was to prevent a vote on HB2020, a cap-and-trade proposal that could lower greenhouse gas emissions by 2050 to combat climate change, in part by increasing fuel taxes. The Senate has 30 seats. Without the Republican senators, the remaining 18 Democratic senators could not reach a quorum of 20 to hold a vote. Republican state senators, including Bentz, continued their boycotts in 2020 to prevent the passage of climate change mitigation response, and 2021, after he left for Congress.

Committee assignments 
Bentz served as vice-chair of the following committees: Transportation and Economic Development, Revenue, Joint Tax Credits, Revenue, Tax Expenditures, Carbon Reduction, and Finance and Revenue. He co-chaired the Transportation Committee and was a member of others.

U.S. House of Representatives

Elections

2020 

Bentz resigned from the Oregon State Senate effective January 2, 2020, to run in the 2020 election for Oregon's 2nd congressional district in the United States House of Representatives. He won the Republican primary and defeated Democrat Alex Spenser and Independent Patrick Archer in the general election.

Tenure 

In the aftermath of the January 6, 2021, storming of the U.S. Capitol, Bentz was reported to have been sheltering in place during the event. In a phone interview with Oregon Public Broadcasting, he declined to call Joe Biden the president-elect, but said any outcome where Biden does not take office was "highly unlikely". The next day, Bentz joined 139 U.S. representatives who objected to Pennsylvania's electoral votes. On January 8, Bentz acknowledged that Biden would become president.

On May 19, 2021, Bentz was one of 35 Republicans who joined all 217 Democrats present in voting to approve legislation to establish the National Commission to Investigate the January 6th Attack on the United States Capitol Complex meant to investigate the storming of the U.S. Capitol.

Committee assignments 
 Committee on Natural Resources
Subcommittee on Water, Oceans and Wildlife (Ranking Member)
Subcommittee on Indigenous Peoples of the United States
 Committee on the Judiciary
Subcommittee on Courts, Intellectual Property and the Internet
Subcommittee on Antitrust, Commercial and Administrative Law

Caucus memberships 
 Republican Main Street Partnership
 Republican Governance Group

Political positions

Veterans Affairs 
On March 3, 2022, Bentz and many other Republicans voted against the Honoring our PACT Act of 2021. Bentz was the only member of Oregon's House delegation to do so.

On January 12, 2022, Bentz voted against the Guard and Reserve GI Bill Parity Act, which would expand eligibility for educational assistance under the G.I. Bill.

Abortion 
Bentz describes himself as pro-life, saying, "I believe that life begins at conception and that life should be protected until death by natural causes occurs." He supports abortion only when the mother's life is at risk.

In 2019, Oregon Right to Life gave Bentz the Atterberry Award, which recognizes Oregon legislators who "are tenacious in their public defense of Oregon’s vulnerable."

Health care 
Bentz has said: "I strongly oppose government run healthcare... I believe Obamacare should be replaced with solutions that focus on free market principles to help drive down the skyrocketing cost of healthcare."

On March 31, 2022, Bentz voted against the Affordable Insulin Now Act, which would cap the cost-sharing of insulin to $35 or 25% of the negotiated price (whichever is lower) for private insurance and $35 for Medicare.

2020 presidential election 
Bentz joined the Republican members of Congress who sided with the Trump campaign's attempts to overturn the 2020 United States presidential election. He voted not to certify Pennsylvania's electoral votes.

LGBTQ+ rights 
On July 19, 2022, Bentz joined 46 other House Republicans in voting for the Respect for Marriage Act, which would repeal the Defense of Marriage Act and require each state, as well as the federal government, to recognize any marriage performed in another state. However, Bentz voted against final passage on December 8, 2022.

Electoral history

Personal life
Bentz and his wife, Lindsay, a veterinarian, live in Ontario and have two children. Bentz has six siblings. He was born to Kenneth and Anne Bentz and raised on family ranches in Harney County. Bentz's grandfather Paul Stewart moved to Harney County in 1916 and purchased a small ranch, slowly trading ranches until he got the current family ranch. Bentz is a devout Roman Catholic and attends Blessed Sacrament Church in Ontario. He chaired the St Peter Catholic grade school board for five years.

References

External links

 Representative Cliff Bentz official U.S. House website
 Cliff Bentz for Congress
 Legislative website
 Biography from Yturri Rose LLC
 

|-

1952 births
21st-century American politicians
American Roman Catholics
Catholics from Oregon
Eastern Oregon University alumni
Lawyers from Salem, Oregon
Lewis & Clark Law School alumni
Living people
Republican Party members of the Oregon House of Representatives
Oregon lawyers
Republican Party Oregon state senators
People from Harney County, Oregon
People from Ontario, Oregon
People from Stayton, Oregon
Politicians from Salem, Oregon
Ranchers from Oregon
Republican Party members of the United States House of Representatives from Oregon